Javier Muñoz is an American actor and singer. He is best known for his performances on Broadway as Usnavi de la Vega in the 2008 musical In the Heights and as Alexander Hamilton in the 2015 musical Hamilton, in which he played the title role from July 11, 2016, until January 14, 2018.

Early life and education
Muñoz, the son of a Puerto Rican family, grew up in the Linden Projects in the Brooklyn neighborhood of East New York. He was the youngest of four boys, all of whom shared their father's artistic inclinations, although he was the only one to go on to pursue a professional career in the arts.

He attended Brooklyn's Edward R. Murrow High School where he participated in the drama club known as the Players' Circle, then earned his Bachelor of Fine Arts degree at New York University, where he was part of the CAP 21 acting program.

Career 
Muñoz's early roles include Ziad, the "best friend" in Kari Floren's The Porch at Altered Stages in New York, and roles in other off-Broadway productions. He was in the 2006 New York Musical Theatre Festival's off-Broadway show All Is Love, and had abandoned acting to accept a full-time job as a manager at the restaurant 44 in Hell's Kitchen, when he auditioned for the musical In the Heights. He landed a role that was cut from the show during rehearsals, but he stayed on as a member of the ensemble.

On February 16, 2009, Muñoz took the male lead of Usnavi de la Vega in the Broadway cast of In the Heights. Theater critic Robert Feldberg wrote that he preferred Muñoz in the role originated by Miranda, pointing out that the romance between Usnavi and Vanessa seemed more "believable" and that in putting across the main storyline in a way that Miranda had been unable to do, Muñoz turned the star vehicle into an "emotionally persuasive" ensemble performance.

In 2015 Muñoz began performing as alternate for the role of Alexander Hamilton in the Broadway production Hamilton. By spring 2016, Muñoz appeared in the role originated by Lin-Manuel Miranda every Sunday and on weekdays whenever Miranda needed to be elsewhere on a weekday. Muñoz played the role of Hamilton the night President Barack Obama brought his family to watch the show. New York Times theatre critic Ben Brantley noted Muñoz's role subbing for Miranda in the role of Hamilton, stating "the cutting carnal edge of Mr. Muñoz's performance may slightly alter the production's chemistry, especially between Hamilton and Angelica Schuyler, his intellectual equal and sister-in-law."

On July 11, 2016, Muñoz assumed the title role in Hamilton from Miranda full-time. He took a leave of absence due to an injury in February 2017, and was temporarily replaced by Jevon McFerrin until his return on March 21, 2017.

In 2017, he was added to the panel of Justin Baldoni's talk show, Man Enough.

On August 2, 2017, Muñoz made a guest appearance in a musical skit on Full Frontal with Samantha Bee. In the skit, Muñoz played the role of an immigrant affected by Kris Kobach's anti-immigration efforts.

Muñoz was announced as a guest star with a recurring role in the third season (2018) of Shadowhunters.

Personal life 
Muñoz is a cancer survivor and has lived with HIV since 2002. He is gay.

On October 15, 2017, Muñoz became part of the #MeToo movement by posting on Twitter in response to Alyssa Milano's call for all who had been sexually harassed or assaulted to join and speak up to bring publicity to the problem. His statement gave no details other than that he had been a victim multiple times.

In March, 2018, Muñoz received backlash following several tweets where he lashed out with explicit language seemingly unprovoked at fans, including one who had simply asked "are you okay." He issued a public apology in April 2018, noting the phrasing of that tweet caused him to recall a recent incident where he had received an anonymous hate note at his building, which had been causing him a significant amount of fear and distress.

Filmography

Films

Television

Theatre credits

See also
 LGBT culture in New York City
 List of LGBT people from New York City

References

External links
 
 
 
 Lin Manuel Miranda introduces Munoz as his replacement in the musical In the Heights

American male musical theatre actors
21st-century American male actors
American gay actors
Living people
Place of birth missing (living people)
Year of birth missing (living people)
People from East New York, Brooklyn
People with HIV/AIDS
American people of Puerto Rican descent
Edward R. Murrow High School alumni
LGBT Hispanic and Latino American people